Yaroslav Alexandrovich Ternovskiy (Russian: Ярослав Александрович Терновский; born 23 April 1970 in Zvenigorod, Russia) is a political and public figure. In 2010–2012 was a member of Civic Chamber of the Russian Federation 3rd composition. Chairman of the All-Russia Public movement "Catholic Heritage". Magistral Delegate to Russia of the Order of the Holy Sepulchre.

Early life 
Ternovskiy was born in Zvenigorod, Russia. He did a compulsory military service in Soviet Armed Forces.

Was an active public figure starting from the young age. In 1987–1988 he participated in the US-Soviet conferences Direct Connection where American high school students met their Soviet counterparts.

In the 1990s he founded companies and became a businessman.

Participated in an Open World Program of the Library of Congress for the young leaders.

Career 
In 1998 he was elected a chairman to an All-Russia public movement "Stability and Progress" and participated in a creation of Unity alliance and election bloc. In 1999 was in Political campaign staff of President Putin and later became his campaign surrogate.

In 2001 he became a head of Organizing Committee for the Russian Party of Social Democracy and later a head of its political council. In 2002 he became a head of the External relations commission of the Public-sector union of Presidential Administration, Government, Federal Assembly and Accounts Chamber . He also continued his career in business as a CEO of an engineering company "Sintezproekt".

In 2006 he was elected chief of the executive committee of Civilian Power. In 2007 became a co-chairman of "Civil Control" association. In 2010 was elected a member of Civic Chamber of the Russian Federation where he became a member of a Commission on tolerance and freedom of conscience.

Catholic community 
Ternovskiy is a member of a Catholic community in Russia. 

In 2015 he was awarded the Order of St. Gregory the Great.

References 

1970 births
Members of the Order of the Holy Sepulchre
Members of the Civic Chamber of the Russian Federation
Knights of St. Gregory the Great
Russian Roman Catholics
Living people